Stanley Pines, also known as "Grunkle Stan", is one of the main characters of the Disney Channel animated series Gravity Falls, created and voiced by the series creator Alex Hirsch. In an interview, Hirsch claims that Grunkle Stan is loosely based on his grandfather, also named Stan.

Stan is the great-uncle (or "grunkle") of the show's two main protagonists, Dipper and Mabel Pines, who are sent to live with Stan at the Mystery Shack, a tourist trap (and his house) which presents creatures and objects of supposedly supernatural origins. He often is depicted wearing a black suit with a white shirt and red string bow tie, along with a red fez, and a cane topped by a billiard 8-ball. At home, however, he is usually seen wearing slippers, blue and green-striped boxer shorts, a white sleeveless shirt and a gold necklace.

At the beginning of the show, Stan, known to all as Stanford Pines, is portrayed as a relatively-simple character, with his shady past being used mostly as a joke. However, as the series goes on, he is gradually revealed to hold deeper secrets; In "Not What He Seems" and "A Tale of Two Stans", his real name is revealed to be Stanley Pines, and that, for the past thirty years, he had been secretly trying to bring his twin brother, the real Stanford Pines, back into their world after he was sucked through an inter-dimensional portal.

Besides the main series, Stan has also made appearances in the 2018 graphic novel, Gravity Falls Lost Legends. An alternative version of the character, named Mr. Ponds, appeared in a 2020 episode of Amphibia, with Hirsch reprising his role.

Fictional character biography

Pre-series
Stanley, nicknamed "Stan", and his six-fingered twin brother Stanford, nicknamed "Ford", were born in Glass Shard Beach, New Jersey. Their father, Filbrick, was a stern pawn shop owner, while his wife Caryn, a pathological liar, worked as a phone psychic. Their last name of "Pines" was reportedly introduced in Ellis Island, but records of the family's original surname have been lost. Stan and Ford often scoured the beach, hunting for lost treasure. One time, they claimed an abandoned ship for themselves, naming it the "Stan-O-War". The twins worked on repairing this boat over time, hoping to sail it around the world one day. The boys were also frequent targets of bullies, so Filbrick signed them up for boxing classes. Stan later used these boxing skills to save a woman named Carla McCorkle, nicknamed "Hotpants", from a robber. However, Carla eventually left him for a music-playing hippie.

In school, Ford was a serious, successful student, while Stan was a prank-loving slacker. On one fateful night, Stan wandered into a science fair hall, inadvertently breaking his brother's prize-winning perpetual motion machine, ruining Ford's chances of being accepted into a prestigious university and straining their relationship. Filbrick disowned Stan, refusing to allow him back home until he could make real money.

Stan first took an interest in sales after seeing a billboard glamorizing it. Using various fake names over time, he started countless companies promoting "revolutionary" products that were really dysfunctional and poorly made. He was chased away by angry mobs every time his products' flaws were discovered, and they were banned in most American states. He was also once arrested in Colombia and deported back to the United States where he was placed on the No Fly List for life, both for reasons unknown.

Stan came to Gravity Falls upon receiving a postcard from Ford, who used his research grants from college to build a house there and study supernatural anomalies. Ford hid two of his three journals documenting his findings, and entrusted the first book to Stan hoping he would agree to bury it "as far away as possible". Outraged that Ford did not call him to reconcile, Stan got into an argument with Ford and tried to burn the journal. While fighting, Stan inadvertently threw Ford into an interdimensional portal, which then ran out of fuel. Stan learned to his dismay that he could not reactivate the portal without all three journals.

After running out of food, Stan went into town to buy some supplies, but locals mistook him for Ford, offering him money for a tour of the house. Adopting the name "Stanford" as his own, Stan tried to impress them with some of Ford's inventions but, after failure, he won the tourists' approval with a fake attraction and converted the house into a tourist trap, initially calling it "The Murder Hut", then renaming it "The Mystery Shack". He even faked his death as Stanley by staging a car crash, erasing his past, and avoiding further pursuit from the police. For the next 30 years, Stan continued to run The Mystery Shack while sneaking into the lab at night, trying to reactivate the portal and rescue Ford.

Main series
For much of Gravity Falls, Stan is shown as a simple, miserly character who devises mischievous, comical plans to earn money mainly from Mystery Shack tourism. Despite his greed, he is genuinely protective of his great-nephew Dipper and great-niece Mabel, whose parents asked him to watch them for the summer. He also pretends to be unaware of Gravity Falls' supernatural oddities and is rivals with Gideon Gleeful: the malevolent 10-year-old proprietor of the "Tent of Telepathy" tourist trap who attempts to claim the Mystery Shack for himself. Unbeknownst to Dipper and Mabel, Stan has the first of Ford's journals. By the end of the first season, Stan obtains all three journals, with the second and third ones respectively having been in the hands of Gideon and Dipper, and eventually succeeds in reactivating the portal and bringing Ford back to his home dimension in "Not What He Seems". The brothers then tell their story to Dipper and Mabel and subsequently struggle to reconnect with each other in preparation for the prophesied "Weirdmageddon" apocalypse brought about by demon and series main antagonist Bill Cipher. During the apocalypse, Stan and an army of the series' characters rescue Ford, but Bill captures both brothers during an argument. To erase Bill from existence and stop the apocalypse, Stan agrees to change clothes with Ford so they can trick Bill, who is after a secret equation only Ford knows, into entering Stan's mind instead. As Ford begins erasing Stan's memory, Stan's mindscape self punches Bill out of existence and realizes that his purpose in life was to protect his family. After Gravity Falls returns to normal, Stan awakens without any memories until his family and friends revive them. On the last day of summer, Stan and Ford agree to live out their dream of sailing around the world to research more anomalies. Stan promotes his handyman Soos to the manager of the Mystery Shack, and he is last seen fighting an anomaly at sea with Ford aboard a ship dubbed the "Stan-O-War II".

Production

Character and concept
Stan is based on Alex Hirsch's grandfather, also named Stan. Both share the characteristics of being big, barrel-chested men whose clothes have popped-undone buttons; both also wear a gold chain and gold rings.

Stan originally looked considerably different than he does in the show. In conceptual art, Stan was shorter, did not have his shoulder pads, and had a pointy pink nose instead of a big orange one. His face also resembled more of a puppet than a grizzled old conman. This version of the character was seen in an unaired unofficial pilot of the show, which was low budget and a pre-production test version based around the aired pilot episode "Tourist Trapped".

Along with Dipper and Mabel, Stan has appeared in almost every episode of the series. He was featured in the Gravity Falls series of shorts entitled "Dipper's Guide to the Unexplained", as well as a short ("Stan's Tattoo") in which the twins investigate the mysterious tattoo on Stan's shoulder. In "A Tale of Two Stans", it's revealed that it was not a tattoo but a burn scar.

In other media

Amphibia

Alex Hirsch voices a character similar to Grunkle Stan named Mr. Ponds, also referred as The Curator, in the Amphibia episode "Wax Museum". He is an amphibian who runs a wax museum similar to the Mystery Shack. Within the episode, the human Anne Boonchuy and the Plantar family arrive in a small town and visit his museum, where he shows them various wax figures (which are real creatures coated in wax). When Anne spots a portable CD player in the museum, she demands to buy it from him, but he initially turns her down. However, after Anne reveals her human appearance, Mr. Ponds offers it to her if she agrees to show off for a night. However, Mr. Ponds plans to cover her in wax like the other exhibits in his museum. The Plantars rescue her and free the wax figures who take their revenge by dragging Mr. Ponds into another room. A pool of red liquid appears underneath it, but Mr. Ponds reveals "It's just wax." However, the very next scene reveals that Mr. Ponds was indeed killed.

Notes

References

External links
 Internet Movie Database

Television characters introduced in 2012
Fictional characters based on real people
Fictional characters from New Jersey
Fictional characters from Oregon
Fictional twins
Fictional con artists
Animated human characters
Gravity Falls characters
Fictional misers
Fictional American Jews
Fictional fist-load fighters
Male characters in animated series
Animated characters introduced in 2012
Fictional impostors